The short-crested monarch (Hypothymis helenae) is a species of bird in the family Monarchidae.
It is endemic to the Philippines. It is found in tropical moist lowland forest. It is threatened by habitat loss.

Description and Taxonomy 
EBird describes the bird as  "A fairly small bird of lowland and foothill forest understory. Male has deep-blue upperparts, head, and chest and a white belly. Told from Black-naped Monarch by its black mark between the eye and bill and from Celestial Monarch by its shorter, bushy crest. Female is told from other monarchs by its gray-blue upperparts. Song is a series of clear piping notes, increasing in volume. Also gives a 2- to 3-note call of sharp rasping notes with the first note higher-pitched." It is often seen in mixed species flocks along with other birds such as Blue-headed fantail, Rufous paradise flycatcher, Sulphur-billed nuthatch and other small forest birds. 

Alternate names for the short-crested monarch include the paradise flycatcher monarch and short-crested blue-monarch.

Subspecies
Three subspecies are recognized:
 H. h. agusanae - Rand, 1970): Found on Dinagat Island, Siargao and eastern Mindanao (east-central and south-eastern Philippines)
 H. h. helenae - (Steere, 1890): Found on Luzon, Polillo Island, Catanduanes and Samar (northern Philippines)
 Camiguin blue-monarch (H. h. personata) or Camiguin monarch - (McGregor, 1907):  Originally described as a separate species. Found on Camiguin Norte (northern Philippines)
and squeals."

Habitat and Conservation Status 
This species is poorly known, but is reported to occupy the understorey of forest below 1,000 m. It is said to be more common on smaller islands such as Camiguin. 

IUCN has assessed this bird as near threatened This species' main threat is habitat loss with wholesale clearance of forest habitats as a result of logging, agricultural conversion and mining activities occurring within the range.

References 

short-crested monarch
Endemic birds of the Philippines
short-crested monarch
Taxa named by Joseph Beal Steere
Taxonomy articles created by Polbot